Sanjao sam noćas da te nemam (Velike rock balade) is a 1984 compilation album by Yugoslav rock band Bijelo dugme that features thirteen of their ballads recorded between 1974 and 1983. The album's name derives from the band's popular ballad "Sanjao sam noćas da te nemam" from 1976 album Eto! Baš hoću!.

The compilation album was released by Jugoton in the wake of Bijelo dugme's decision to leave the label following a lacklustre reaction to their latest studio album Uspavanka za Radmilu M., having more than a million copies sold.

Track listing

LP (1984)

A side
 "Ima neka tajna veza" (Duško Trifunović/Bregović) - 3:30
 "Selma" (Vlado Dijak/Bregović) - 3:25
 "Došao sam da ti kažem da odlazim" (Bregović) - 3:39
 "Loše vino" (Arsen Dedić/Bregović) - 2:37
 "Pristao sam biću sve što hoće" (Duško Trifunović/Bregović) - 3:01
 "Sanjao sam noćas da te nemam" (Bregović) - 6:51

B side
 "Ne gledaj me tako i ne ljubi me više" (Bregović) - 5:40
 "Kad zaboraviš juli" (Bregović) - 4:29
 "Ako možeš zaboravi" (Bregović) - 4:59
 "Sve će to mila moja prekriti ruzmarin, snjegovi i šaš" (Bregović) - 7:57

CD (1994)
 "Šta bi dao da si na mom mjestu" (Duško Trifunović/Goran Bregović) - 6:47
 "Ima neka tajna veza" (Duško Trifunović/Bregović) - 3:30
 "Selma" (Vlado Dijak/Bregović) - 3:25
 "Došao sam da ti kažem da odlazim" (Bregović) - 3:39
 "Blues za moju bivšu dragu" (Bregović) - 6:17
 "Loše vino" (Arsen Dedić/Bregović) - 2:37
 "Ove ću noći naći blues" (Bregović) - 4:17
 "Sanjao sam noćas da te nemam" (Bregović) - 6:51
 "Ne gledaj me tako i ne ljubi me više" (Bregović) - 5:40
 "Kad zaboraviš juli" (Bregović) - 4:29
 "Ako možeš zaboravi" (Bregović) - 4:59
 "Sve će to mila moja prekriti ruzmarin, snjegovi i šaš" (Bregović) - 7:57
 "Pristao sam biću sve što hoće" (Duško Trifunović/Bregović) - 3:01

Personnel 
Željko Bebek - vocals
Goran Bregović - guitar
Zoran Redžić - bass guitar
Ipe Ivandić - drums
Điđi Jankelić - drums
Milić Vukašinović - drums
Vlado Pravdić - keyboards
Laza Ristovski - keyboards

References
Discogs: Bijelo Dugme - Sanjao Sam Noćas Da Te Nemam (Velike Rock Balade)

Bijelo Dugme compilation albums
1984 compilation albums
Jugoton compilation albums